The Central District of Golpayegan County is a district (bakhsh) in Golpayegan County, Isfahan Province, Iran. At the 2006 census, its population was 82,601, in 24,701 families.  The District has three cities: Golpayegan, Guged, and Golshahr. The District has three rural districts (dehestan): Jolgeh Rural District, Kenarrudkhaneh Rural District, and Nivan Rural District.

References 

Golpayegan County
Districts of Isfahan Province